W248CF is an FM translator-style radio station that is licensed to and serving Bowling Green, Kentucky. The station is owned and operated by Western Kentucky University. 
Although Radio-Locator.com lists is a repeater station of WKYU-FM, W248CF is actually broadcasting a Classical music format as a new local service of WKU Public Radio.

History
Although test broadcasts began in March 2016, the official launch of the station took place in the second week of April 2016. The official license was granted by the Federal Communications Commission on March 21, 2016.

Programming
Music played on W248CF includes symphonies, including those of the New York Philharmonic, the Dallas and Chicago Symphinies, and Metropolitan Opera. Content is provided through Public Radio Exchange. The station is also the area's local affiliate of the WFMT Radio Network.

References

External links
WKU Public Radio website 
WKU Classical 97.5 Schedule
 
 Radio Locator Information for W248CF

  

NPR member stations
248CF
Radio stations established in 2016
2016 establishments in Kentucky
Western Kentucky University